Princess Mikhaelia Audrey Megonondo (born 30 August 2000) is an Indonesian commercial model and a beauty pageant titleholder who won the title of Miss Indonesia 2019 that was held on 15 February 2019. She represented Indonesia at the Miss World 2019 pageant on 14 December 2019, held in ExCeL London, London - United Kingdom, where she placed in the top 40.

Early life and education
Princess was born in Jambi on 30 August 2000, with the name Princess Mikhaelia Audrey Megonondo, to a Javanese-born mother, and her father came from the land of Sumatra - Jambi. Therefore, she followed Miss Indonesia representing Jambi Province, because she had a Jambi lineage from his father. In an interview session in the final night of Miss Indonesia 2019 with host Daniel Mananta, her mother said that she wanted to be a princess since she was child who could inspire the younger generation, especially women. Princess Megonondo is the first child of two brothers, she is currently studying at Bina Nusantara University majoring in international business management. She's also work as a commercial model for magazine and TV commercial since she was 8 years old.

Outside her academic and modeling activities, Princess is also active in various social activities. When she was in high school at Harapan Bangsa School, Princess's social care grew when she joined the "Walk-A-Thon", which is raising funds to donate to orphanages each year. She is also active as a volunteer of the Sahabat Peduli Indonesia, the movement that teaches art and recycled garbage around Ngurbloat Beach, Maluku Tenggara and Jambi in 2016.

Princess has a hobby of learning foreign languages. She was fluently speaks English, Mandarin, and French, beside her mother language Bahasa Indonesia. She is also made several achievements in a number of foreign language competitions, one of which is a winner in the School English Debate Competition in 2015–2017.

Pageantry

Miss Indonesia 2019 
Princess represents Jambi province in the selection of Miss Indonesia 2019. At the end of the contest, she became the winner after competing with 33 other finalists from 33 provinces. She successfully amazed the Jury when the chairman of the Jury Liliana Tanaja Tanoesoedibjo gave a questions about what would be done to maximize the profits obtained as Miss Indonesia. Princess replied:

After being chosen as Miss Indonesia, Princess officially became the representative of Indonesia in the Miss World 2019 event. The finale coronation night of Miss Indonesia 2019 was attended by the current Miss World 2018, Silvia Vanessa Ponce de León Sánchez of Mexico as a main Guest-star.

Miss World 2019 
Megonondo represented Indonesia at Miss World 2019 in ExCeL London, London - United Kingdom on 14 December 2019, where she placed in the top 40. By the end of the event, outgoing Miss World 2018 Vanessa Ponce crowned her successor Toni-Ann Singh of Jamaica as Miss World 2019.

References

External links 
 
  Miss Indonesia Official Website

Living people
2000 births
People from Jambi
Javanese people
Indonesian female models
Indonesian beauty pageant winners
Miss Indonesia winners
Miss World 2019 delegates